The Sanders-Hollabaugh House is a historic house on Church Street in Marshall, Arkansas.  It is a single story wood-frame structure, built in a T shape with a shed-roof porch extending around the base of the T.  Built in 1903, it is the best local example of a prow house, in which the base of the T projects forward.  The house was built on what was then known as the Bratton Addition, a relatively new subdivision in the city, and has long been owned by the Hollabaugh family.

The house was listed on the National Register of Historic Places in 1993.

See also
National Register of Historic Places listings in Searcy County, Arkansas

References

Prow houses
Houses on the National Register of Historic Places in Arkansas
Houses completed in 1903
Houses in Searcy County, Arkansas
National Register of Historic Places in Searcy County, Arkansas